Boebe or Boibe was a town in ancient Crete, which was in the Gortynian district. Scholars tentatively locate Boebe at the modern village of Pompia in the municipal unit of Moires, municipality of Faistos, regional unit of Heraklion.

References

Populated places in ancient Crete
Former populated places in Greece